Seaán mac Oliver (John) Bourke, 17th Mac William Íochtar (Lower Mac William or Mac William Oughter) (died 1580) was an Irish noble who was created Baron Ardenerie (1580).

Career
Bourke was the son of Oliver Bourke of Tirawley, grandson of Seaán Bourke, and a great-grandson of Ricard Ó Cuairsge Bourke, 7th Mac William Íochtar (d.1479). He developed his power base using gallowglass mercenaries, and by 1570 was regarded as the next Mac William Íochtar (Lower Mac Williams). He was created Baron Ardenerie in May 1580.

Despite the contemporaneous culture of those of his class, he had little love for war and seemed concerned for the well-being of his people. Upon being reproached by an old woman for burdening his people with the maintenance of his Scottish troops, he lamented that without them, they would be at the mercy of their enemies who would be just as burdensome.

Book of the Burkes
Bourke is rightly famous as the patron of The Book of the Burkes. He spoke Irish and Latin, but not English.

He died on 24 November 1580, and was succeeded, as Baron Ardenerie, by his son William. As Mac William Íochtar, he was succeeded by his cousin, Richard "the Iron" Bourke, 18th Mac William Íochtar (d.1583), the son of David de Búrca, 15th Mac William Íochtar.

Genealogy

 Sir Edmond Albanach de Burgh (d. 1375),  1st Mac William Íochtar (Lower Mac William), (Mayo)
 William de Burgh (d.1368)
 Thomas mac Edmond Albanach de Burca, 1375–1402, 2nd Mac William Íochtar
 Walter mac Thomas de Burca (d.1440), 3rd Mac William Íochtar
 Theobald Bourke (d.1503), 8th Mac William Íochtar
 Meiler Bourke (d.1520), 11th Mac William Íochtar
 Ricard Bourke (d.1509), 9th Mac William Íochtar
 Seaán an Tearmainn Bourke (alive 1527), 13th Mac William Íochtar
 Ricard mac Seaán an Tearmainn Bourke (d.1571), 16th Mac William Íochtar
 Edmund na Féasóige de Burca, (d.1458), 4th Mac William Íochtar
 Ricard Ó Cuairsge Bourke (d.1473), 7th Mac William Íochtar
 Edmond de Burca (d.1527), 10th Mac William Íochtar
 Walter de Burca
 Seaán de Burca
 Oliver de Burca
 Seaán mac Oliver Bourke (d.1580), 17th Mac William Íochtar
 Richard Bourke (d.1586), 19th Mac William Íochtar
 Walter Ciotach de Burca of Belleek (d.1590)
 Tibbot (Theobald) MacWalter Kittagh Bourke, 21st Mac William Íochtar, 1st Marquess of Mayo
 Walter (Balthasar) Bourke, 2nd Marquess of Mayo
 Thomas Ruadh de Burca
 Uilleag de Burca
 Edmond de Burca (d.1527), 12th Mac William Íochtar
 David de Burca (alive 1537), 15th Mac William Íochtar
 Richard the Iron Bourke (d.1583), 18th Mac William Íochtar
 Tibbot (Theobald) ne Long Bourke (1567-1629), 23rd Mac William Íochtar, 1st Viscount Mayo (1627)
 Viscounts Mayo
 William "the Blind Abbot" Bourke (d.1593), 20th Mac William Íochtar
 Theobald mac Uilleag Bourke (d.1537), 14th Mac William Íochtar
 Risdeárd de Burca
 Ricard Deamhan an Chorráin de Burca
 Risdeárd Mac Deamhan an Chorráin (Richard) "the Devils Hook" Bourke (d.1601), 22nd Mac William Íochtar
 Seaán de Burca (d.1456)
 Tomás Óg de Burca, (d.1460), 5th Mac William Íochtar
 Risdeárd de Burca (d.1473), 6th Mac William Íochtar

Notes and references

  - AB-ADAM to BASING

Further reading
 
 Lower Mac William and Viscounts of Mayo, 1332-1649, in A New History of Ireland IX, pp. 235–36, Oxford, 1984 (reprinted 2002).
 Burke (de Burgh), John (Seaan, Shane Mac Oliverus, Terry Clavin, inn Dictionary of Irish Biography from the Earliest Times to the Year 2002, edited by James McGuire and James Quinn, pp. 38–39. Cambridge, 2010.

People from County Mayo
16th-century Irish people
Seann mac Oliver
1580 deaths
Year of birth unknown
Ardenerie, John Bourke, 1st Baron of